Desectophis is a genus of mites in the family Ologamasidae. There are at least four described species in Desectophis.

Species
These four species belong to the genus Desectophis:
 Desectophis eulateris (Karg, 1998)
 Desectophis flagellatus Karg & Schorlemmer, 2011
 Desectophis magnosimilis Karg, 2003
 Desectophis pulcher Karg, 2003

References

Ologamasidae